Frank Block is a Wilmington, North Carolina attorney, a trustee of the University of North Carolina at Wilmingotn, and a former state senator.

Block created the Charles and Hannah Block Distinguished Scholar in Jewish History chair at the University of North Carolina, Wilmington, in honour of his parents, Charles and Hannah Block, in 2010.

References

North Carolina state senators
Year of birth missing (living people)
Living people